Panagiotis Logaras (born 26 November 1972) is a retired Greek football goalkeeper.
His son Pavlos, is also professional football player.

References

1972 births
Living people
Greek footballers
Greek expatriate sportspeople in Germany
Enosi Alexandroupoli players
Doxa Drama F.C. players
Kavala F.C. players
OFI Crete F.C. players
Association football goalkeepers
Super League Greece players